Frederick Nolan may refer to:

Frederick Nolan (theologian) (1784–1864), Irish theologian
Frederick Nolan (writer) (1931–2022), British writer
Frederick G. Nolan (1927–2016), Canadian surveyor